Woodlands, or the William Gilmore Simms Estate, is a historic plantation estate in Bamberg County, South Carolina.  The property is nationally notable as the home for many years of author William Gilmore Simms (1806-1870), considered one of the leading literary voices of the antebellum Southern United States, and was designated a National Historic Landmark in 1971.  The main house, built in part by Simms, contains mementos from his period.

Description and history
The main estate house is a two-story structure, brick on the first floor and wood frame on the second. Its main facade is five bays across, with asymmetrical window and door placement. The estate has two outbuildings from the 1860s: a small cabin that was used by William Gilmore Simms as a study, and a small dairy house.

The estate was already of some age when William Gilmore Simms inherited it from his in-laws in 1836.  It was for many years his primary residence, where many of his most significant works were written.  The main estate house was rebuilt several times, once after a fire, and again after its destruction by Union Army forces late in the American Civil War.  Simms was not able to fully rebuild the main house, and only completed the library wing in 1867, which forms the first floor of the current main house.

A documentary was made about the enslaved population at the Woodlands plantation.

See also
List of National Historic Landmarks in South Carolina
National Register of Historic Places listings in Bamberg County, South Carolina

References

External links

Woodlands, Bamberg County (S.C. Hwy. 78, Bamberg vicinity), at South Carolina Department of Archives and History

National Historic Landmarks in South Carolina
Houses in Bamberg County, South Carolina
Houses on the National Register of Historic Places in South Carolina
Houses completed in 1836
Historic American Buildings Survey in South Carolina
National Register of Historic Places in Bamberg County, South Carolina